Randall Carver (born May 25 in Fort Worth, Texas) is an American actor. Carver started his acting career in the late 1960s, and had roles in films and television. He portrayed John Burns throughout the first season (1978–79) of Taxi.

Early life and education 
Carver, a Texan native, graduated from Missouri Military Academy and then West Texas State University. He also graduated from the Fine Arts program of the University of California, Los Angeles.

Career 
Carver appeared in minor roles, including his uncredited debut in the 1969 film Midnight Cowboy. His first major appearance was the 1973 drama film Time to Run as Jeff Cole, an environmentalist who attempts to sabotage his father's (Ed Nelson) nuclear power plant. He portrayed Jeffrey DeVito, gangster husband of Cathy Shumway (Debralee Scott), in the 1977–78 television series Forever Fernwood. He also made guest appearances in other television series, like Emergency!, The Six Million Dollar Man, and The Waltons, and appeared in stage plays and in made-for-television films during the 1970s.

Taxi 
In the first season (1978–79) of the television sitcom series Taxi, Carver portrayed John Burns, "a [naïve student] who lands in the taxi business more by default than design." Marley Brant in her book Happier Days (2006) praised Carver's acting but found his character John not well developed, even with his wedding subplot. Carver said,

His character was written out after the first season, not returning for the second season.

Post-Taxi career 
Carver appeared in other films and television programs thereafter. He made a guest appearance as the fiancé of "a girl from West Virginia" (Loni Anderson) in one segment of the two-part 1980 episode, which was filmed in 1979, of the television series The Love Boat, alongside other guest stars of the similar segment Donny Osmond and Rich Little. He portrayed a killer in the 1980 made-for-television film Detour to Terror. He portrayed Lieutenant Vaughn Beuhler, the "doltish [lieutenant and the station's] program director," one of the principal characters in the 1980 sitcom The Six O'Clock Follies, set in the television station in Saigon, South Vietnam, in 1967 (during the Vietnam War). He also appeared in The Norm Show and Malcolm in the Middle in late 1990s and 2000s. Carver portrayed Mr. Bankside in the 2007 film There Will Be Blood.

Personal life
Carver is married to writer Shelley Herman.

Selected filmography 

Films
 Midnight Cowboy (1969), uncredited role
 Time to Run (1974), Jeff Cole – Carver's first major role
 Detour to Terror (1980, TV), Nick – killer
 There Will Be Blood (2007), Mr. Bankside

Television series
 Emergency! (1970s), various roles
 The Waltons, Monty Vandenberg – "The Deed" (1973)
 The Six Million Dollar Man, PFC Robert E. Barris – "Survival of the Fittest" (1974)
 Forever Fernwood (1977–78), Jeffrey DeVito – rebranded title of Mary Hartman, Mary Hartman
 Taxi, John Burns (1978–79)
 The Love Boat, Elmar Fargas – Season 3, Episode 18–19 (1980)
 The Six O'Clock Follies (1980), Lt. Vaughn Beuhler
 The Norm Show (1999–2001), various roles
 Malcolm in the Middle, Joshua – "The Block Party" (2004)

References 

 General

External links 
 
 

Living people
Male actors from Fort Worth, Texas
People educated at Missouri Military Academy
Place of birth missing (living people)
University of California, Los Angeles alumni
West Texas A&M University alumni
Year of birth missing (living people)
20th-century American male actors
21st-century American male actors